1949 Országos Bajnokság I (men's water polo) was the 43rd water polo championship in Hungary. There were ten teams who played one-round match for the title.

Final list 

* M: Matches W: Win D: Drawn L: Lost G+: Goals earned G-: Goals got P: Point

2. Class 
1. Bp. Lokomotív 10, 2. Csepeli MTK 8, 3. MTE 6, 4. KaSE 4, 5. BRE 2, 6. OTI 0 point.

Sources 
Gyarmati Dezső: Aranykor (Hérodotosz Könyvkiadó és Értékesítő Bt., Budapest, 2002.)

1949 in water polo
1949 in Hungarian sport
Seasons in Hungarian water polo competitions